The Diocese of York is an administrative division of the Church of England, part of the Province of York. It covers the city of York, the eastern part of North Yorkshire, and most of the East Riding of Yorkshire.

The diocese is headed by the Archbishop of York and its cathedral is York Minster. The diocese is divided into three archdeaconries of Cleveland in the north (with a Bishop of Whitby), the East Riding (with a Bishop of Hull), and in the south-west the Archdeaconry of York (with a Bishop of Selby).

The diocese was once much larger, covering Yorkshire, Nottinghamshire and Derbyshire and parts of Northumberland, Lancashire, Cumberland and Westmorland.

Bishops
The diocesan Archbishop of York is primarily supported by three suffragan bishops: the Bishops of Hull (founded 1891), of Whitby (founded 1923) and of Selby (founded 1939). While not operating a formal area scheme, each suffragan takes informal responsibility for one archdeaconry (East Riding, Cleveland and York respectively). Alternative episcopal oversight (for parishes in the diocese who reject the ministry of priests who are women) is provided by the provincial episcopal visitor (PEV) the Bishop suffragan of Beverley; unlike in most dioceses, Beverley does not need to be licensed as an honorary assistant bishop since he is a suffragan in the diocese.

There are four retired honorary assistant bishops licensed in the diocese:
2002–present: David Smith, retired Bishop of Bradford, Bishop suffragan of Maidstone and Bishop to the Forces, lives in Dunnington and is also licensed in Europe diocese.
2009–present: Graham Cray, retired Archbishops' Missioner and fresh expressions Team Leader and former Bishop suffragan of Maidstone lives in Harrietsham, Kent (in Canterbury diocese, where he is also licensed.)
2010–present: Gordon Bates, retired Bishop suffragan of Whitby, lives in Brompton, Hambleton.
James Jones, retired Bishop of Liverpool, Bishop to Prisons and Bishop suffragan of Hull;

David James, retired Bishop of Bradford and Martin Wallace, retired Bishop suffragan of Selby, live in Beverley and Bridlington respectively, but there is no evidence that either has been licensed as an honorary assistant bishop.

History
In 1541, the archdeanery of Richmond, North Yorkshire, which included part of the Yorkshire Dales, North Lancashire (including Furness), the southern part of Westmorland and the ward of Allerdale above Derwent in Cumberland, became part of the new Diocese of Chester. (These areas later became parts of other dioceses.)

In 1836 the western part (corresponding broadly to the West Riding) was split into the Ripon diocese, which was later subdivided into the dioceses of Ripon and Leeds, Bradford, and Wakefield and now constitutes most of the Diocese of Leeds. In 1884 Nottinghamshire and Derbyshire became part of the new Diocese of Southwell, from which Derbyshire was split off again in 1927 to form the Diocese of Derby. In 1914 the Diocese of Sheffield, (covering South Yorkshire), was split off as an independent diocese.

Archdeacon for Generous Giving and Stewardship
David Butterfield resigned as Archdeacon of the East Riding on 26 May 2014 in order to be collated as "Archdeacon for Generous Giving and Stewardship" that 23 June, a position he held until he retired on 1 July 2017.

Archdeaconries and deaneries 

From 1972 to 2017 the Deanery of Hull was, unusually, sub-divided into three Area Deaneries of Central and North Hull, East Hull, and West Hull.

References

Church of England Statistics 2002

External links
Diocesan website

 
York